The 2009 season is the Melbourne Victory's second season of football (soccer) in Australia's women's league, the W-League.

Season 2 - 2009

Fixtures

Standings

Players

Player Movement

In
 Vedrana Popovic (Sydney FC)
 Katie Thorlakson
 Stephanie Catley
 Deanna Niceski
 Julianne Sitch
 Monnique Hansen Kofoed
 Katrina Gorry
 Jessica Humble
 Gulcan Koca
 Caitlin Friend

Out
 Meghan Archer
 Louisa Bisby
 Rebecca Tegg
 Stephanie Tanti
 Brittany Timko
 Sophie Hogben
 Deanna Niceski
 Daniela Digiammarco
 Bronwyn Nutley
 Alisha Foote

Leading scorers

The leading goal scorers from the regular season.

Squad statistics
Last updated 18 October 2009

Milestones
First game = 2-0 win home V Perth Glory
Largest win = 2-0 away V Adelaide United
Largest loss = 0-1 home  V Brisbane Roar

2009
Melbourne Victory